Jarritos is a brand of soft drink in Mexico, founded in 1950 by Don Francisco "El Güero" Hill and now owned by Novamex, a large independent bottling conglomerate based in Guadalajara, Jalisco, property of the Hill & ac. Co. It is also distributed in some areas of Mexico by the Pepsi Bottling Group and Cott.

Jarritos is made in fruit flavors and is less carbonated than popular soft drinks. It is made in Mexico. Many Jarritos varieties are naturally flavored. The word jarrito means "little jug" in Spanish and refers to the Mexican tradition of drinking water and other drinks in clay pottery jugs. Produced in Mexico, they are sold throughout the Americas. Jarritos comes in 370 ml (12.5 oz) and 600 ml (20 oz) glass and plastic as well as 1.5-liter bottles.

History 
Jarritos broke Mexican soft drink standards by offering a larger 400 ml bottle with a coffee-flavored drink. Shortly after launching the first Jarritos in Mexico City, Francisco Hill developed a process to remove tamarind juice extract to create the first tamarind-flavored soft drink in Mexico: Jarritos Tamarindo. Hill quickly followed with Mandarin, Lemon, and Fruit Punch flavors gaining greater market share and becoming the national soft drink of Mexico.

Exports to the United States began in 1989. According to the 2009 edition of the book Mexico Greatest Brands, 6000 bottles of Jarritos are shipped across the border each minute.

Flavors 
Jarritos is or was available in fifteen flavors:

 Fruit Punch
 Grapefruit
 Guava
 Jamaica
 Lemon Lime
 Lime
 Mandarin
 Mango
 Manzana
 Mexican cola
 Passion Fruit
 Pineapple
 Strawberry
 Tamarind
 Watermelon

Gallery

See also

List of brand name soft drink products
List of soft drink flavors

References

External links 

 
 Jarritos Canada

Food and drink companies established in 1950
Soft drinks manufacturers
Fruit sodas
Mexican drinks
Drink companies of Mexico
Food and drink companies of Mexico
Products introduced in 1950
Mexican brands
Mexican companies established in 1950